Dermond is a surname.  Notable people with the surname include:

 Percy Dermond (19192012), Australian rugby league footballer
 Russell C. Dermond (19362015), American canoeist
 Russell J. Dermond (19252014), American murder victim; husband of Shirley W. Dermond
 Shirley W. Dermond (19262014), American murder victim; wife of Russell J. Dermond

See also 

 McDermond